Fuxing District (復興區) may refer to:

 Fuxing District, Handan, district of Handan, Hebei, China (People's Republic of China)
 Fuxing District, Taoyuan, district of Taoyuan, Taiwan (Republic of China)